Lesley Carstens (born 6 April 1965) is a South African sprint canoer who competed in the early 1990s. At the 1992 Summer Olympics in Barcelona, she was eliminated in the semifinals of the K-2 500 m event.

She was also a sprint runner and surprisingly is also from Benoni

References
Sports-Reference.com profile

1965 births
Canoeists at the 1992 Summer Olympics
Living people
Olympic canoeists of South Africa
South African female canoeists